Sandra Collins (born 16 July 1970) is an Irish mathematician and leading academic librarian, who is the university librarian of University College Dublin, Ireland’s largest university, since 2022. She was director of the National Library of Ireland from 2015.

Career
Collins attended University College Dublin, graduating with a BSc in Mathematics and Mathematical Physics in 1991, and receiving a PhD in Nonlinear Fluid Dynamics in 1996.

She worked as a lecturer in mathematics at Dublin City University, with Ericsson, and as director of the Digital Repository of Ireland at the Royal Irish Academy. 

She was appointed director of the National Library of Ireland in 2015, for a five-year term, and agreed a second term from 2020.  She has been the university librarian at University College Dublin since 2022.

Additional roles
Collins has been the chair of the Consortium of National and University Libraries (CONUL), a member of the Irish Government’s Expert Advisory Group for Commemorations, and of the Advisory Forum to the Irish Government’s National Conversation on Research, and of the council of the Research Data Alliance (RDA).

Recognition
Collins received three Ireland eGovernment awards for collaborative digital cultural projects: ‘Promoting Ireland Overseas’, ‘Open Source’, and ‘Overall Winner’. She received the UCD Alumni Award in Research, Innovation and Impact in 2020.

References 

1970 births
Alumni of University College Dublin
Living people
Irish librarians
Women librarians
Academics of Dublin City University
Irish women mathematicians
Ericsson people
20th-century Irish mathematicians
21st-century Irish mathematicians